Lauritz is a typically masculine given name, a Scandinavian form of the English Laurence or Lawrence. Another Danish and Estonian form is Laurits.

Popularity in Scandinavia 
The name has been decreasing in popularity in all Scandinavian countries ever since the 1880s. The table below shows percentage of the respective country's population named Lauritz or Laurits.

People 
People with the given name Lauritz include:
 Andreas Lauritz Thune (18481920), Norwegian engineer and businessman
 Vidkun Quisling, Norwegian politician
 Carl Lauritz Mechelborg Oppen (18301914), Norwegian jurist and politician
 Claus Lauritz Clausen (182092), American Lutheran minister and politician
 Jan-Lauritz Opstad (born 1950), Norwegian museum director and art historian
 Jens Lauritz Arup (17931874), Norwegian bishop and politician
 Johan Lauritz Eidem (18911984), Norwegian politician
 Johan Lauritz Rasch (18291901), Norwegian jurist and politician
 Lauritz Petersen Aakjær (18831959), Danish architect
 Lauritz Bergendahl (18871964), Norwegian Nordic skier
 Lauritz Christiansen (sailor) (18671930), Norwegian sailor who competed in the 1920 Summer Olympics
 Lauritz Dippenaar, South African businessman
 Lauritz Jenssen Dorenfeldt (engineer) (18631932), Norwegian engineer, son of Lauritz Jenssen, father of Lauritz Jenssen Dorenfeldt the jurist
 Lauritz Jenssen Dorenfeldt (jurist) (190997), Norwegian jurist, son of Lauritz Jenssen Dorenfeldt the engineer
 Lauritz Falk (190990), Swedish actor, film director, singer and painter
 Lauritz Galtung (61), Norwegian nobleman
 Lauritz Hartz (190387), Danish artist
 Lauritz Peter Holmblad (181590), Danish industrialist and philanthropist
 Lauritz Dorenfeldt Jenssen (180159), Norwegian businessperson, father of Lauritz Jenssen
 Lauritz Jenssen (183799), Norwegian businessperson and politician, son of Lauritz Dorenfeldt Jenssen, father of Lauritz Jenssen Dorenfeldt
 Lauritz Johnson (190692), Norwegian novelist, children's writer, and radio and television host
 Lauritz Lauritzen (191080), German politician
 Lauritz Melchior (18901973), Danish-born operatic baritone and tenor who relocated to America
 Lauritz Nelson (18601944), U.S. naval sailor, recipient of the Medal of Honor
 Lauritz Opstad (19172003), Norwegian museum director and historian
 Lauritz Christian Østrup (18811940), Danish fencer who competed at the 1908 and 1912 Summer Olympics
 Lauritz Kolderup Rosenvinge (18581939), Danish botanist and phycologist
 Lauritz Kristian Nilssen Rygh (18741950), Norwegian journalist, newspaper editor and politician
 Lauritz Sand (18791956), Norwegian topographer, officer in the Dutch army, estate owner in the Dutch East Indies, businessman, and resistance fighter during World War II
 Lauritz Schmidt (18971970), Norwegian yacht racer and businessperson
 Lauritz Schoof (born 1990), German rower who competed in the 2012 Summer Olympics
 Lauritz Bernhard Sirevaag (born 1926), Norwegian politician
 Lauritz Smith (18301924), American Mormon leader, one of the founders of Draper, Utah
 Lauritz de Thurah (170659), Danish architect and architectural writer
 Lauritz Weibull (18731960), Swedish historian
 Lauritz Weidemann (17751856), Norwegian judge, civil servant and politician
 Lauritz Wigand-Larsen (18951951), Norwegian gymnast who competed in the 1920 Summer Olympics
 Mads Lauritz Madsen (17821840), Norwegian politician
 Niels Lauritz Dahl (19252014), Norwegian diplomat
 Thomas Johannes Lauritz Parr (18621935), Norwegian educator and psychologist

See also 
 Lauritz H. and Emma Smith House, a historic house in Draper, Utah
 Lauritz Smith House, a different historic house in Draper, Utah
 Laurits (disambiguation)
 Lauritzen (disambiguation)

References 

Danish masculine given names
Norwegian masculine given names
Swedish masculine given names